Major Charles Henry John Chetwynd-Talbot, 20th Earl of Shrewsbury, 20th Earl of Waterford, 5th Earl Talbot, KCVO (13 November 1860 – 7 May 1921), styled Viscount Ingestre from 1868 to 1877, was a British peer. Unusually for a wealthy nobleman of the period, he began several businesses connected with road transport, with mixed success.

Family background
Shrewsbury, who was born at Eaton Place, Belgravia, London, was the only son and heir of Charles Chetwynd-Talbot, 19th Earl of Shrewsbury and 4th Earl Talbot. His grandfather, The 18th Earl of Shrewsbury, had inherited the earldoms from a very distant cousin, and had to prove his claim to the premier earldoms of Great Britain and Ireland on the Roll in the House of Lords by demonstrating his descent from the 2nd Earl of Shrewsbury and 2nd Earl of Waterford. Shrewsbury was the nephew of: Constance, who married The 8th Marquess of Lothian; Gertrude, who married The 13th Earl of Pembroke; and Adelaide, who married The 3rd Earl Brownlow, the brother of Theresa, a notable hostess, who married The 6th Marquess of Londonderry.

Inheritance
Shrewsbury's very rich father died when Shrewsbury, then styled as Viscount Ingestre, was a schoolboy of 16. All his father's property and personal wealth were left to the young Lord Shrewsbury's mother. She lived until 1912, when he was aged 51.

Education and marriage
Lord Shrewsbury was educated at Eton College and inherited his titles when only 16 years of age. At the age of 19, he eloped with an older married woman, Ellen,  née Palmer-Morewood, wife of commoner, Alfred Edward Miller Mundy of Shipley Hall, whom she had married in 1873. Ellen was a granddaughter of The 7th Baron Byron (a cousin of The 6th Baron Byron, the famous poet), and already had a daughter. Shrewsbury's heir, Lord Ingestre, was born less than three months after the marriage of his parents. Ingestre died in the lifetime of his parents, but had several children, including The 21st Earl of Shrewsbury and 21st Earl of Waterford, the father of the current Earl.

Public offices and honours
In right of his peerage, Lord Shrewsbury became Hereditary Lord High Steward of Ireland, in which capacity he took part in the coronations of Kings Edward VII and George V, and accompanied the former on his state visit to Dublin in July 1903. He was made KCVO in 1907. He also became High Steward of the Borough of Stafford in 1892.

Equestrian interests
He started his own polo club in 1893. In 1895, Lord Shrewsbury founded the Staffordshire Polo Club at his house, Ingestre Hall. Players included The 8th Earl of Harrington, Algernon Burnaby, Captain Daily Fergusson, Captain The Hon. Robert Greville, Gerald Hardy, Albert Jones, Captain "Wendy" Jones, Edward and George Miller, Norman Nickalls, Bertram Portal, Captain Gordon Renton, Jasper Selwyn and John Reid Walker.

Greyhound coach

A devotee of coach driving, for several seasons Lord Shrewsbury ran the daily Greyhound (i.e. fast) coach service the 20 miles from fashionable Buxton Spa to his house, Alton Towers, now the site of a theme park.

Investing in personal transportation

Hansom cabs de luxe

For many years he was in business as a hansom cab owner, his vehicles marked "S.T." (for Shrewsbury and Talbot) and the horses "being of the best possible quality", and he was the first owner to have cabs that were fitted with noiseless tyres operating in London and Paris.

To begin with, drivers paid £1 a day for the use of the horse and cab, keeping the remainder of their takings. In slack periods the drivers would strike, asking Lord Shrewsbury for a price reduction. In the summer of 1888, he floated a public listed company, The Shrewsbury and Talbot Cab and Noiseless Tyre Company Limited, to buy two businesses. Firstly, the business of cab proprietor and job master worked by the earl himself, and secondly the business of The Noiseless Tyre Company Limited, manufacturers of steel and rubber tyres in Manchester and London.

In the spring of 1891, following almost annual strikes by his cab drivers, Lord Shrewsbury put his company's 300 horses up for sale, under police protection, in the company's Battersea premises. At that time they operated from a number of yards in different parts of London. The press reported the terms offered to drivers in detail,  then the prices of the horses, and advised that every animal put up for sale had been sold. Strong competition from other rubber tyred cabs seems to have become a serious problem. The business was restarted in October 1891 with cabmen friendly to the company.

Motoring
In November 1900, Lord Shrewsbury formed another public listed company, Shrewsbury S T and Challiner Tyre Company Limited, to manufacture and deal in cabs, carriages, motor cars, cycles, vehicles, tyres, tubes, wire, India rubber and gutta percha goods, etc. In December 1903, he was described in a court action brought by Dunlop over the importation of Michelin tyres as "proprietor of the business known as Maison Talbot in London's Long Acre managed by Mr Weigel."

In March 1901 he formed British Automobile Commercial Syndicate Limited "with objects sufficiently indicated by the title". The shareholders were not people of note but provided addresses in the then almost semi-rural Ladbroke Grove, Notting Hill, Shepherd's Bush areas and Hatton Garden EC. One of the shareholders was a Mr R. Weigel of 25 Maxilla Gardens, North Kensington. Lord Shrewsbury was the first chairman. The other first directors were M. Chabert, president of the Société Commerciale d'Automobiles, Paris, and Mr D.M. Weigel, managing director. The new premises, (formerly occupied by carriage builders) at 97-98 Long Acre (adjoining 1 Endell Street), covered "four large floors". Twelve months later, Lord Shrewsbury was made chairman of Messrs J.  Rothschild and Son Limited, incorporated to carry on the business of making motor car bodies by expanding the London activities of the well-known French businesses of Clément-Rothschild and Messrs J. Rothschild and Son. The second floor of the same building was to be Maison Talbot, suppliers of Talbot tyres (as fitted by The Hon. C.S. Rolls), the third floor to be automobile clothing. In March 1909, Shrewsbury made a formal announcement that he would close the business which could be seen to be competing with his Talbot agents.

In 1909, he floated Homoil Trust Limited, leading a board of the late engineer-in-chief of the Navy, another colliery owner and a well-known consulting engineer.  The company was formed to purchase and develop various patents for the production of a cheaper home-produced and more efficient substitute for petrol made from coal-tar. It was voluntarily wound up at the end of 1910.

Talbot motorcars

Lord Shrewsbury founded Clément-Talbot Limited in 1902. He built for it the United Kingdom's first purpose-built automotive-manufacturing plant in London's North Kensington with his own personal crest set high above the entrance to the administration building. He involved Adolphe Clément-Bayard as his "engineer" and began by importing his popular French Clément-Bayard cars into Britain.

At Brooklands in November 1912, Lord Shrewsbury's Talbot car of only 25.6 horsepower rating, driven by Percy Lambert, attained a speed of 113.28 miles per hour and broke many other class records. The only faster car on the Brooklands track was a Mercedes-Benz of 84.8 horsepower rating.

Military service
The Earl served entirely on home service in Britain during the First World War.  He was a Major in the Army Remount Service of the Army Service Corps from 1914 to 1915, and temporary Major with the Royal Welch Fusiliers 1916 to 1917. In January 1915, his only son, Viscount Ingestre, a reservist in the Royal Horse Guards at Regent's Park Barracks, died in London of influenza followed by pneumonia.

Later life
Lord Shrewsbury died in May 1921, aged 60, and was buried at the parish church of Ingestre. There then ensued an inheritance battle for his estate between his wife and his grandson. His grandson, John, 21st Earl of Shrewsbury, claimed the late 20th Earl had not been of sound mind when his last will was written and won a court settlement. Ellen left the house the late Earl had built for her, 'Cariad' in Goring-on-Thames, moving to 'Cariad Cottage' in an equally tranquil setting. Prior to Lord Shrewsbury's death, he had already bequeathed her the sum of £2,000 per month until she died.

Ancestry

Notes

References

External links
https://web.archive.org/web/20040607043755/http://www.sunbeam.org.uk/Talbot.htm

1860 births
1921 deaths
People educated at Eton College
Charles Talbot
English polo players
Earls of Shrewsbury
Earls of Waterford
Talbot
Automotive businesspeople
Barons Talbot
British Army personnel of World War I
Royal Army Service Corps officers
Royal Welch Fusiliers officers
Earls Talbot